Ryan Christopher Lizza (born July 12, 1974) is an American journalist. His 2017 interview with White House Communications Director Anthony Scaramucci allegedly resulted in Scaramucci's dismissal. Later that year, Lizza was accused of sexual misconduct in the context of the Me Too movement. After a decade-long run as The New Yorkers Washington correspondent, the magazine's internal review of the allegation against Lizza led to his dismissal. Several other media organizations declined to terminate or bar Lizza from employment in light of their own investigations. He is currently the chief Washington correspondent for Politico and a senior political analyst for CNN.

Education
Lizza attended the Berkshire School, a private co-educational boarding school in the town of Sheffield, Massachusetts, and received his bachelor's degree from the University of California, Berkeley.

Journalism career
Lizza started his career at the Center for Investigative Reporting in San Francisco, where he worked on the Emmy Award-winning Frontline documentary Hot Guns. In 1998, he joined The New Republic, where he became senior editor. From 1998 to 2007, Lizza covered Bill Clinton's impeachment, the Florida recount, the George W. Bush administration, and the 2004 presidential election. In 2004, he also wrote about politics for The Atlantic, including one of the first national magazine profiles of Barack Obama. From 2004 to 2006, Lizza was a contributing editor for New York magazine, where he wrote about national politics. In 2006 and 2007, Lizza was also a correspondent for GQ. From 2002 to 2007, Lizza regularly contributed to The New York Times.

In 2004, The Washington Post described Lizza as part of the latest "crop of younger journalists who grab the attention of the media establishment through dogged reporting, sparkling writing or provocative analysis."

In 2007, Lizza became the Washington correspondent for The New Yorker magazine, where he covered the White House, three presidential elections (2008, 2012, and 2016), the administrations of George W. Bush, Barack Obama, and Donald Trump, and wrote the magazine's "Letter From Washington" column. Lizza covered the 2008 U.S. presidential election for The New Yorker, and wrote an extended profile of Barack Obama's career in Illinois politics. During the campaign, a cartoon in the New Yorker allegedly caused the Obama campaign to exclude Lizza from Obama's campaign plane, with a lack of space cited as the reason. In 2017, Lizza was fired from The New Yorker in relation to an allegation of sexual harassment.

On December 17, 2018, Publishers Marketplace reported that Lizza and Olivia Nuzzi, the Washington correspondent for New York magazine, were writing a "coauthored account of the 2020 presidential campaign" for Avid Reader Press, an imprint of Simon & Schuster.

On August 30, 2019, in a note to staff, Carrie Budoff Brown, Politico’s editor, and Matthew Kaminski, Politico’s Editor-in-Chief, announced that Lizza was joining Politico as Chief Washington Correspondent.

Sexual misconduct allegation

On December 11, 2017, The New Yorker fired Lizza, saying that he engaged in "improper sexual conduct." Lizza called The New Yorker'''s characterization a "terrible mistake" that had been "made hastily and without a full investigation of the relevant facts." His alleged victim supported the magazine's version of the events; in a statement, her attorney, Douglas Wigdor, said, "[I]n no way did Mr. Lizza’s misconduct constitute a 'respectful relationship' as he has now tried to characterize it." Lizza was temporarily suspended by CNN pending an investigation; six weeks later, the network announced that its "extensive investigation" had yielded "no reason to continue to keep Mr. Lizza off the air." Politico, Rolling Stone and other media organizations were later said to have reached similar conclusions in determining whether to bar Lizza from employment.

Personal life
Lizza is a resident of Washington, D.C. He has two children and was previously married to Christina Gillespie, a doctor.

In September 2022, Lizza became engaged to New York magazine correspondent Olivia Nuzzi.

Awards
In 2008, Lizza was a finalist for the National Magazine Award for Reporting, which "honors the enterprise, exclusive reporting, and intelligent analysis that a magazine exhibits in covering an event, a situation, or a problem of contemporary interest and significance."

In June 2009, The Washingtonian magazine included Lizza on its list of Washington's "50 Top Journalists" and described him as a writer who "change[s] the way readers see the world." That same year, his profile of President Barack Obama was nominated for a National Magazine Award.

In 2011, he received an Everett McKinley Dirksen Award for Distinguished Reporting on Congress Honorable Mention and Toner Prize for Excellence in Political Reporting Honorable Mention for his reporting on Congress's failed attempt to pass climate legislation.

In 2012, he won the Edwin M. Hood Award for Diplomatic Correspondence "for his coverage of the U.S. foreign policy battles during the 'Arab Spring.'"

On April 27, 2013, the White House Correspondents' Association presented Lizza with the Aldo Beckman Memorial Award for journalistic excellence "for his remarkable efforts to provide an independent perspective on President Barack Obama's presidency and re-election."

In 2015, he was a finalist for the Newhouse School Mirror Award competition honoring excellence in media industry reporting (Best Single Article, Digital Media).

Lizza's writing was included in the 2003, 2004, 2006, 2007, 2008, and 2009 editions of The Best American Political Writing''.

References

External links
Archive of stories by Lizza in POLITICO
Archive of stories by Lizza in Esquire
Archive of stories by Lizza in GQ
Archive of stories by Lizza in The Atlantic
Archive of stories by Lizza in The New Yorker
Archive of stories by Lizza in New York
Archive of stories by Lizza in The New York Times
Archive of stories by Lizza in The New Republic

Living people
1974 births
American columnists
American people of Italian descent
Berkshire School alumni
CNN people
The New Yorker people
University of California, Berkeley alumni